Doły may refer to the following Polish places:
 Doły, Lesser Poland Voivodeship (south Poland)
 Doły, Łomża County in Podlaskie Voivodeship (north-east Poland)
 Doły, Mońki County in Podlaskie Voivodeship (north-east Poland)
 Doły, Lublin Voivodeship (east Poland)
 Doły, Grodzisk Wielkopolski County in Greater Poland Voivodeship (west-central Poland)
 Doły, Słupca County in Greater Poland Voivodeship (west-central Poland)
 Doły, Silesian Voivodeship (south Poland)
 Doły, Pomeranian Voivodeship (north Poland)
 Doły, West Pomeranian Voivodeship (north-west Poland)

See also 
 Doly (Karviná), district of the city of Karviná, Czech Republic
 Doly Begum, Canadian politician